Adair Cardoso (born June 27, 1993) is a Brazilian singer and composer of sertanejo music. His first success was the song "Que se Dane o Mundo", which was the theme of the 18th season of the TV series Brazilian Malhação.

Biography 
Cardoso was born in Tangará da Serra, and began his career when he was a child. His father noticed his son could easily play musical instruments, such as the accordion. He almost single-handedly learned to play several instruments. At 6 years old, Cardoso began to sing songs he heard on the TV and radio.

At 8 years old, his father's management introduced him to Wagner Tadeu Paula, the manager of sertanejo duo Gino e Geno.

At 11 years old, Adair went on a television show, Raul Gil, where his work became recognized nationally and internationally.

At 13 years old, Adair released his first studio album, Coração Adolescente in February 2007.

Discography 
 Coração Adolescente (2007)
 Coração de Quem Ama (2009)
 Adair Cardoso – Ao Vivo (2010)

Singles 
 "Coração Adolescente" (2007)
 "Coração de Quem Ama" (2008)
 "Chora Coração" (2010)
 "Que se Dane o Mundo" (2010)
 "Enamorado" Participação de Claudia Leitte (2012)

References

External links
 https://web.archive.org/web/20100829185411/http://www.adaircardoso.com.br/

1993 births
Living people
21st-century Brazilian male singers
21st-century Brazilian singers
People from Mato Grosso